Peter Barker may refer to:

 Peter Barker (footballer) (born 1936), Australian rules footballer
 Peter Barker (physicist) (born 1967), Australian-born British physicist
 Peter Barker (sailor) (born 1955), British Virgin Islands sailor
 Peter Barker (squash player) (born 1983), English squash player